The Goldthwait Sea was a sea that emerged during the last deglaciation, starting around 13,000 years ago, covering what is now the Gulf of Saint Lawrence and surrounding areas.
Areas on the Anticosti Island and low-lying regions of Quebec and the Maritimes bordering the Saint Lawrence were below sea level.
As the land rebounded over the next 3,000 years, despite rising sea levels the sea retreated to roughly the present boundaries of the Gulf.

Name

The term "Goldthwait Sea" was proposed by Elson in 1969 to distinguish the area from the Champlain Sea and the Laflamme Sea.
The sea is named after the geologist James Walter Goldthwait (1880–1947).
He did impressive work for the Geological Survey of Canada in the east of the country, and in Quebec in particular, despite handicaps such as lack of aerial photographs or detailed topographical maps.
The quality of his observations and his insights were remarkable.

Overall process

Formation of the Goldthwait Sea was part of a broader process in what is now eastern Canada towards the end of the Last Glacial Period.
The atmosphere was warmer near the oceans and towards the south, so melting of the Laurentide Ice Sheet progressed from east to west and from south to north.
Around 12,000 years ago the Saint Lawrence Valley was opened to sea waters, 
The western arm of the Goldthwait Sea quickly extended up the Saint Lawrence, and this was followed by the Champlain Sea invasion.
Three factors affected the area of the sea: the retreat of the ice sheet, isostatic rebound by the land and the rising sea level.

The final retreat of the Laurentide Ice Sheet from eastern North America occurred between 12,000 and 10,000 years age.
Freed from the pressure of the ice sheet, the land began to rise, and the shores of the seas retreated.
This post-glacial rebound (or isostatic rebound) continues today.
Isostatic rebound was rapid at first, and 85% of the coastal area had emerged by 9,000 years ago.

Large amounts of fresh water, including melted ice and precipitation, flowed into the North Atlantic Ocean during the deglaciation.
Water was released from the glacial Lake St Lawrence around 11,000 years ago, and from the glacial Lake Agassiz between 10,900 and 9,900 years ago.
Renewed warming caused run-off from the glacial Lake Agassiz and Lake Barlow-Ojibway between 9,500 and 8,000 years ago.
The water seems to have flowed out into the ocean without mixing with the salt water in the depths of the Goldthwait Sea.

Chronology

The Goldthwait Sea, defined as the late-Glacial and post-Glacial invasion of the sea into Saint Lawrence estuary east of Quebec City and the Gulf of Saint Lawrence, began around 14,000 years ago.
This was when the ice sheet was first withdrawn from the Gulf of Saint Lawrence.
At that time the global sea level was about  lower than it is today.
The sea was able to cover the coastal areas of the Saint Lawrence because the land had subsided under the burden of the ice sheet.
After this, sea levels gradually rose as water from the ice sheet was returned to the ocean, but at the same time the land rebounded, causing a complex sequence of submersion.
There were two main phases, a short phase of sea invasion as soon as the ice sheet moved back from the coast, and a much longer phase of retreat as the continent rose isostatically, a process that is not yet fully complete.

Dionne (1977) proposes three major episodes: Lower Goldthwaitian 13,500 to 12,000 years ago, Middle Goldthwaitian 12,000 to 9,000 years ago, and Upper Goldthwaitian, 9,000 years ago until the present.
Complicating the picture is that deglaciation did not occur at the same time throughout the region, so the sea reached the south and east of the area before it reached the west and north.
To allow for regional variations in the timing of events, Dionne therefore proposes calling the phases Goldthwaitian I, II and III.

In the first phase, lasting 500 to 1,500 years, the sea followed the retreating glacier front.
The waters were cold and salinity low, and the sea was often ice-covered.
The sea may have been prevented from entering some of the valleys by lingering ice.
Isostatic recovery began in this phase.
In the second phase, lasting for 2,000 to 3,000 years, the sea first advanced and then retreated.
During this phase isostatic uplift was rapid, but sea levels were also rising.
There was much sedimentation along the shoreline, with deltas formed at the mouths of the main rivers on the north shore fed by meltwater from the ice sheet on the Laurentian Shield.
The waters were still cold, but warmer and more saline than before.
The third phase, lasting from 9,000 or 8,000 years ago until the present, was one of the sea slowly retreating.
Isostatic recovery slowed to a few millimeters per year, but sea level rises were also small.
Around 5,500 years ago the last of the ice sheet vanished from the center of Quebec.
During this phase streams cut channels through the sediments laid down in the previous phase.

Changes in extent 

The Goldthwait Sea began to form in the Saint Lawrence Estuary and Gulf around 13,500 years ago.
The present coastal plain was covered by the Goldthwait Sea.
Some fjords reached  further inland.

Many shorelines can be seen at different elevations in the area that was once submerged.
The difference can be partly accounted for by the ice cap having retreated earlier in the southern area, which would have rebounded further before the sea levels rose.
There must have also been a thicker ice sheet further north, depressing the land further.

Sedimentary evidence

The bed of the Goldthwait sea had inter-layered coarse sands and silty clays around its margins, and massive light gray fine clays further down.
Rebound has exposed these sediments along the Saint Lawrence river and estuary.
Three type of sediment can be seen along the Quebec coast.
Silt and clay were deposited in deep water where river currents had no influence, deltaic sands were deposited where currents carried sediment into the sea, and as the sea receded a blanket of coastal sand was deposited over both these types of sediment.
Tidal flat clays are also found in some backwater areas of the sea.

Notes

Sources

Natural history of Quebec
Pleistocene
Seas of the Atlantic Ocean
Last Glacial Period
Seas of Canada